Scopula dentisignata is a moth of the  family Geometridae. It is found in Tanzania, Zimbabwe, South Africa and Zambia.

References

Moths described in 1863
dentisignata
Moths of Africa